Gasherbrum VI, also known as Chochordin Peak, is a 6979m mountain in the Gasherbrum massif, located in the Karakoram range of Gilgit–Baltistan, Pakistan. The mountain is considered unclimbed.

Notes

Mountains of Gilgit-Baltistan
Six-thousanders of the Karakoram